Alaninema ngata is a species of nematode.

Distribution
The species is endemic to New Zealand, where it is widespread.

Biology
The species is an intestinal parasite in terrestrial slugs of the family Athoracophoridae.

References

Nematodes described in 2013
Terrestrial biota of New Zealand
Rhabditida